Malin Therese Alshammar (born 26 August 1977) is a Swedish swimmer who has won three Olympic medals, 25 World Championship medals, and 43 European Championship medals. She is a specialist in short distances races in freestyle and butterfly. She is coached by former Swedish swimmer Johan Wallberg. She is the first female swimmer and the third overall (after Lars Frölander and Derya Büyükuncu) to participate in six Olympic Games.

Biography
Alshammar was born in Solna in 1977, daughter of 7th placed Olympic breaststroke swimmer Britt-Marie Smedh and Krister Alshammar. She started swimming on the team of Sundbybergs IK.

At the beginning of her career she was a backstroke swimmer and in 1991, the year Alshammar turned 14, she won her first national short course title on 50 m backstroke at the 1991 Swedish Short Course Swimming Championships. The year after, when she was 14 years old, she won her first national long course senior title, 100 m backstroke at the 1992 Swedish Swimming Championships representing Järfälla SS.

Alshammar was a part of the Swedish team in 1993 European Championships in Sheffield, finishing fourth in the 100 m backstroke final, and in the inaugural World Short Course Championships in Palma de Mallorca. In Palma de Mallorca she took a ninth place in the individual 100 m backstroke, swum the prelims in the silver medal winning 4×100 m freestyle team and came fourth in the 4×100 m medley alongside breaststroker Hanna Jaltner, butterfly swimmer Ellenor Svensson and Linda Olofsson on the freestyle leg.

She first appeared on the international scene after the 1994 World Aquatics Championships where she made the semifinals in the 100 m backstroke. In the 1996 Olympics, she participated in this event and reached the semifinals.

In 1997, Alshammar moved to the United States and Lincoln, Nebraska to study at the University of Nebraska–Lincoln and swim for the Nebraska Cornhuskers swimming and diving team together with Destiny Laurén under the coach Cal Bentz. The time in the United States resulted in one individual 1999 Big 12 Conference Women's Swimming and Diving Championships gold medal, on the 100 yard freestyle. At the NCAA Division 1 Women's Swimming and Diving Championships, she won a silver medal in the 4×200 yard relay team 1998 and fourth in 50 yard freestyle and 100 yard freestyle 1999. Under her first year she was a part of the Nebraska Cornhuskers Big 12 Conference Women's Swimming and Diving Championships team. At a personal level she studied advertising.

Alshammar also trained at The Race Club, a swimming club founded by Olympic Swimmers Gary Hall Jr. and his father, Gary Hall Sr. The Race Club, originally known as "The World Team," was designed to serve as a training group for elite swimmers across the world in preparation for the 2000 Sydney Olympic Games. To be able to train with the Race Club, one must either have been ranked in the top 20 in the world the past 3 calendar years or top 3 in their nation in the past year. The Race Club included well-known swimmers as Roland Mark Schoeman, Mark Foster, Ryk Neethling, Ricky Busquet.

Alshammar won her first international medal, a bronze in the 50 m freestyle, at the 1997 European Championships. She developed this stroke into her speciality and won the silver at the 1999 European Championships. She broke through to the top ranks at the 2000 Summer Olympics in Sydney where she won silver medals in the 50 m and 100 m freestyle, both times vanquished by Inge de Bruijn, and a bronze medal with the Swedish relay team.

Since Sydney, she has been a favourite at major international events over short distances. At the World Championships in 2001 she won two silver medals, this time in the 50 m freestyle and 50 m butterfly. In the 2002 European Championships in Berlin she won the 50 m freestyle.

In 2003, she let up to focus on the Athens 2004 Olympic Games. In her only start in the 50 m, she barely missed a medal, coming fourth in the 50 m freestyle.
In the 2005 World Aquatics Championships in Montreal, she won a bronze medal in the 50 m butterfly, and took the gold on the same distance at World Championships in Shanghai 2011. By winning three individual events at the 2006 Swedish Short Course Swimming Championships in Uppsala, she took her 73rd gold medal and became the Swedish swimmer with the most individual gold medals on the Swedish Championships, passing Anders Holmertz with one. She took her first gold medal in 1991.

On 17 March 2009, at the Australian Swimming Titles, she broke her own world record in the 50-meter butterfly with a time of 25.44. She was later disqualified by Swimming Australia for wearing two swimsuits. FINA, swimming's governing body, had ratified a new rule only 17 days previously that swimmers can only wear one suit. Alshammar initially appealed the disqualification but withdrew the appeal when the new rule was explained to her.

On 31 July 2011 she won the gold medal at 50 meter freestyle at the 2011 World Aquatics Championships, making her the oldest woman to win an individual gold medal at the long-course world championships. The day before, she had already won the silver medal in the 50 meter butterfly.

During the London Summer Olympics Alshammar participated in the 50 m freestyle, where she placed 6th.

In June 2016 she became the first female swimmer and the third overall (after Lars Frölander and Derya Büyükuncu) to participate in six Olympic Games. At the 2016 Summer Olympics, she competed in the 50 m freestyle event. She placed 15th in the semifinals and did not advance to the final.

Alshammar was the flag bearer for Sweden at the opening ceremony of the 2016 Summer Olympics in Rio de Janeiro.

Personal life
In June 2013 they became parents of a son. She will participate in Let's Dance 2018 broadcast on TV4.

She grew up in Duvbo, a part of Sundbyberg Municipality.

Awards
 Radiosportens Jerringpris: 2010
 Svenska Dagbladet Gold Medal: 2011
 Victoria Scholarship: 2000
 FINA Swimmer of the Year: 2010
 H. M. The King's Medal 8:e with ribbon

Personal bests

Long course (50 m)

Short course (25 m)

Clubs 
 Sundbybergs IK
 Stockholmspolisens IF
 Järfälla SS (−1992)
 SK Neptun (1993–1995, 1996–2008)
 Helsingborgs SS (1996)
 Täby Sim (2008–)

See also 
 World record progression 50 metres butterfly
 World record progression 50 metres freestyle
 World record progression 100 metres freestyle

References

External links 
 
 

1977 births
Living people
People from Solna Municipality
Swedish female backstroke swimmers
Swedish female butterfly swimmers
Swedish female freestyle swimmers
Swedish female medley swimmers
Olympic swimmers of Sweden
Swimmers at the 1996 Summer Olympics
Swimmers at the 2000 Summer Olympics
Swimmers at the 2004 Summer Olympics
Swimmers at the 2008 Summer Olympics
Swimmers at the 2012 Summer Olympics
Swimmers at the 2016 Summer Olympics
Olympic silver medalists for Sweden
Olympic bronze medalists for Sweden
Olympic bronze medalists in swimming
World Aquatics Championships medalists in swimming
Medalists at the FINA World Swimming Championships (25 m)
European Aquatics Championships medalists in swimming
Nebraska Cornhuskers women's swimmers
University of Nebraska–Lincoln alumni
Sundbybergs IK swimmers
Stockholmspolisens IF swimmers
Järfälla SS swimmers
SK Neptun swimmers
Helsingborgs SS swimmers
Täby Sim swimmers
World record holders in swimming
Medalists at the 2000 Summer Olympics
Olympic silver medalists in swimming
Sportspeople from Stockholm County
20th-century Swedish women
21st-century Swedish women